Blue Orange is a French board game company based in Pont-à-Mousson, France. Often called Blue Orange international or Blue Orange Europe and mistaken for Blue Orange Games.

It was founded in 2005 by Jalal Amraouza and Timothée Leroy and initially called Jactalea. The name changed in 2013 for Blue Orange following the meeting of its owner and Blue Orange Games' founder Thierry Denoual.

Blue Orange is a board game publisher whose games are accessible to the public, and includes games for children, teenagers, families, and adults. Blue Orange releases around 10 of new board games every year. These board games are usually made out of wood, tin, resin, and recycled/recyclable materials.

Blue Orange Group 
The group Blue Orange is constituted by three entities:
 Blue Orange Edition (France) is the engineering consulting firm of the group. They are in connection with the authors of game around the world and test more than 1,000 games a year.
 Blue Orange Games (US) is the distributor of Blue Orange's games in the United States, Canada, Australia and New Zealand.
 Blue Orange (France) which approve, validate and distribute the Blue Orange's games in the rest of the world: Europe, South America, Africa, and Asia.

Blue Orange's games are distributed on 5 continents and in 59 different countries.

Awards

2019 
 Mr Wolf: As d'Or Children Game of the year

2018 
 Panic Mansion: Kinderspiel des Jahres Nominee
 Photosynthesis: Mensa Select Winner

2017 
 Bubble Jungle: Major Fun Award
 ChickyBoom: Kinderspiel des Jahres Recommended
 Baobab: UK Games Expo Best Children's Game Winner
 Dr Eureka: Game of the Year in Finland
 Kingdomino: Game of the year in Germany, Italia, Gouden Ludo Best Family Game
 Queendomino: Golden Geek Best Family Board Game Nominee

2016 
 Dr Eureka: Best toy for kids Award from the ASTRA
 New York 1901: Mensa select Winner, Gioco dell’Anno Nominee

2015 
 ChickyBoom: UK Games Expo Best Children's Game Winner
 Battle Sheep: Årets Spil Best Family Game Winner
 King's Gold: Lys Grand Public Finalist
 New York 1901: Vuoden Peli Strategy Game of the Year Winner

2014 
 Battle Sheep: Vuoden Peli Family Game of the Year Winner, Spiel des Jahres Recommended

2013 
 Baobab: Kinderspiel des Jahres Recommended
 Flash: Spring Parents’ Choice Fun Stuff Award Winner

2004 
 Gobblet Gobbler: Årets Spel Best Children's Game Winner

Products 

 Sherlock Express
 Slide Quest
 Kuala
 Planet
 Mr. Wolf ?
 Who Did It?
 Photosynthesis
 Panic Mansion
 Kingdomino
 Dr Eureka
 New York 1901
 Okiya
 BraveRats
 Battle Sheep
 Kamon
 Pengoloo
 Gobblet Gobblers
 Gobblet
 Gyges
 Mana
 Kameloot with illustrations by Ingenious Studios

References

Sources
 http://france3-regions.francetvinfo.fr/lorraine/emissions/chronique-l-edition-de-l-emploi-de-lorraine-matin/lundi-2-novembre-le-boom-du-jeu-de-societe.html
 http://www.mylorraine.fr/article/chicky-boom-un-jeu-lorrain-a-mettre-sous-le-sapin/29854
 http://www.jugamostodos.org/index.php/noticias-en-el-mundo/noticias-94262/6582-dr-eureka-en-astra
 https://boardgamegeek.com/boardgamepublisher/5022/blue-orange-eu
 https://www.societe.com/societe/blue-orange-484754577.html
 http://www.blueorangegames.eu/wp-content/uploads/2019/05/A3-Historique.jpg
 https://boardgamegeek.com/boardgame/331635/kameloot
 https://blueorangegames.eu/en/games/kameloot/

Board game publishing companies